Trebacosa is a genus of wolf spiders first described by Dondale & Redner in 1981.

Species 
 it contains only two species:
 Trebacosa europaea Szinetar & Kancsal, 2007 — Hungary
 Trebacosa marxi (Stone, 1890) — USA, Canada

See also 
 List of Lycosidae species

References

External links 

Lycosidae
Araneomorphae genera
Spiders of North America